Six Points may refer to:

Canada
Islington-Six Points, an area of the former city of Etobicoke, Ontario, now part of Toronto, Canada

United States
Six Points, Clay County, Indiana
Six Points, Hendricks County, Indiana
Six Points, Ohio
Six Points Texas, an outdoor Western set on the backlot of Universal Studios Hollywood

See also
Six point movement, political movement in East Pakistan
Six-Point Formula of 1973 (Telangana), Indian government policy for Telangana
Six-pointed star